This is a list of buildings designed in part or full by Edmund Blacket. Blacket was an Australian architect, best known for his designs for The University of Sydney, St. Andrew's Cathedral, Sydney and St Saviour's Cathedral, Goulburn.

While Edmund Blacket's university buildings have been maintained and continue in use, few of Blacket's commercial buildings have survived, with none of his Sydney banks remaining. Residential buildings are better represented, and include cottages, terrace houses and mansions.

Of Blacket's more than 100 designs for churches, 84 can be identified as having been built to his plans, with a number of others being detailed or substantially designed by his sons Arthur and Cyril. In addition he supervised the building of several other churches and made major contributions to a dozen more, such as the towers and spires at St John's, Darlinghurst and Christ Church St. Laurence, the chancel of St John's, Camden and the roof of St. Judes, Randwick. Of these churches, 80 are known to remain substantially intact. Of the churches and cathedral listed below, all are Anglican (formerly the Church of England in Australia), unless otherwise stated.

See also 

 Architecture of Australia

References 

 
Blacket
Blacket